South Carolina Highway 462 (SC 462) is a  primary state highway in the U.S. state of South Carolina. It serves as a circuitous routing through northern and eastern Jasper County.

Route description

SC 462 is a rural two-lane highway that makes a half-circle in Jasper County, broken into five named sections of road.  The first section named Gillison Branch Road begins at the intersection of U.S. Route 321 (US 321) in Robertville, goes northeast to US 601 in Pineland, then east connecting with US 278 in Gillisonville. The second section named Morgandollar Road connects Gillisonville with Coosawhatchie. The third section, named Nuna Rock Road is a former overlap with US 17 within Coosawhatchie. The fourth section named Coosaw Scenic Drive connects Coosawhatchie with SC 336 in Old House. The fifth section named Lowcountry Drive continues on from SC 336 to its eastern terminus at SC 170 in Beaufort County.

The highway connects to several historic places, including Robertville Baptist Church, Gillisonville Baptist Church and the Old House Plantation.  However, it is not scenic as it is predominantly forest or swampland.

History
The highway was established in 1941 or 1942 as a new primary routing from SC 170 to SC 46 in Bluffton, existing entirely in Beaufort County. In 1956, SC 462 ceded some of its routing to SC 46 (Bluffton Road). In 1958, SC 462 was extended north to Coosawhatchie and then west to SC 128 in Gillisonville replacing SC 170.

Between 1965-1967, SC 462 east was truncated to US 278 in Old House, its old alignment south to near Bluffton becoming part of US 278.  By 1998, SC 462 was extended south after US 278 realignment to near Hardeeville, reclaiming some of its old routing to SC 170.

Major intersections

See also

References

External links

 
 Mapmikey's South Carolina Highways Page: SC 462

462
Transportation in Jasper County, South Carolina
Transportation in Beaufort County, South Carolina
1942 establishments in South Carolina
U.S. Route 278